Hoheisel is a German surname. Notable people with the surname include:

Guido Hoheisel (1894–1968), German mathematician
Marie Hoheisel (1873–1947), Austrian women's rights activist
Tobias Hoheisel (born 1967), German-born stage designer and director
Nick Hoheisel,American Politician Kansas State House of Representatives, District 97

German-language surnames